Pusnes is a village in Arendal municipality in Agder county, Norway.  The village is located on the southwestern edge of the island of Tromøy, just across the strait from the town of Arendal.  There is a ferry that regularly crosses the strait from Pusnes to Arendal.  Pusnes is primarily an industrial area.

References

Villages in Agder
Arendal